Bhago Mohan Pyare is an Indian Marathi language television series which was aired on Zee Marathi. It starred Atul Parchure, Deepti Ketkar and Sarita Mehendale-Joshi in lead roles.

Plot 
Mohan is a teacher who decides to propose to the woman of his dream, Ms. Godbole. Mohan and the other teachers take the students to a village for a picnic. An old man tells Mohan about the ghost in that village. Later, he sees a beautiful woman at a debilitated Wada. Later, he marries that beautiful woman after that he realises that her teeth like a vampire and feet turned backwards like ghosts.

Cast 
 Atul Parchure as Mohan Ashtaputre
 Deepti Ketkar as Meera Godbole
 Sarita Mehendale-Joshi as Madhuvanti
 Mayuresh Khole as Digambar
 Kshitij Zavare as Madan
 Gajesh Kamble as Gunaji
 Snehal Shidam as Kamini Lanke
 Sheetal Shukla
 Vivek Joshi

Awards

Reception

Special episode (2.30 hours) 
 24 November 2019
 22 December 2019

Ratings

References

External links 
 
 Bhago Mohan Pyare at ZEE5

Marathi-language television shows
2019 Indian television series debuts
Zee Marathi original programming
2020 Indian television series endings